was a Japanese project group formed by Second Shot in 2013. The group featured voice and stage actresses from various talent agencies and were promoted through the online radio program A&G Girls Project Trefle. The group's original line-up consisted of Yui Kano, Yui Ishikawa, Chihiro Ikki, Yukari Goto, Minami Takahashi, and Marina Tanoue. Nanami Kashiyama, Eri Suzuki, Karin Takahashi, and Ayumi Takamune were added as members in April 2014. The group disbanded on October 5, 2016.

History

Trefle was created as a girl group featuring voice actresses Yui Kano, Yui Ishikawa, Chihiro Ikki, Yukari Goto, Minami Takahashi, and Marina Tanoue, who are all part of different talent agencies. The group was promoted through the online radio program A&G Girls Project Trefle. Trefle released their first album, Anison Kamikyoku + ChainChro on October 23, 2013, which also featured a collaboration with Chain Chronicle. In April 2014, Nanami Kashiyama, Eri Suzuki, Karin Takahashi, and Ayumi Takamune were added as members. On September 26, 2014, they released their second album, Anison Kamikyoku +.

Afterwards, Trefle changed labels from Second Shot to Feel Mee. On November 18, 2015, they released their first single, "Butter-Fly", a cover of Kōji Wada's 1999 debut single. On April 6, 2016, they released their second single, "Sakura."

On July 29, 2016, the official website announced that after discussion with the members, Trefle would disband after their final concert on October 5, 2016. They released their final album, Final Project, on September 28, 2016.

Members

Discography

Studio albums

Singles

References

External links
 

Anime musical groups
Japanese girl groups
Japanese pop music groups
Musical groups established in 2013
Musical groups disestablished in 2016
Musical groups from Tokyo
2013 establishments in Japan